Q School 2021 – Event 2 was the second of three qualifying tournaments for the 2021–22 snooker season. It took place from 2 to 7 June 2021 at the Ponds Forge International Sports Centre in Sheffield, England.

Format 
The draw was made on 18 May 2021, with players seeded for the first time in the tournament's history. The seeded players were those that dropped off the tour at the end of the 2020–21 season, or those who ranked highly in 2020 Q School. The event was played in a knockout system with the winner of each section earning a two-year tour card to play on the main tour for the 2021–22 and 2022–23 seasons. All matches were the best-of-seven frames.

Main draw

Section 1 
Round 1

Section 2 
Round 1

Section 3 
Round 1

Section 4 
Round 1

Century breaks 
Total: 22

140, 135, 111  Ross Muir
138  Patrick Wallace
116, 105  Soheil Vahedi
114  Michael Tomlinson
113  Alfie Burden
113  Alex Taubman
112  Ivan Kakovskii
109, 102  Lei Peifan
107  Luo Honghao
106  Kishan Hirani
106  Julien Leclercq
105  James Cahill
103, 100  Mitchell Mann
103  Simon Bedford
101  Michael Judge
100  Paul Davison
100  Barry Pinches

References

Snooker competitions in England
Q School (snooker)
2021 in snooker